The 1986 Aloha Bowl was a college football bowl game, played as part of the 1985–86 bowl game schedule of the 1986 NCAA Division I-A football season. It was the 5th Aloha Bowl.  It was played on December 27, 1986, at Aloha Stadium in Honolulu, Hawaii. The game matched the Arizona Wildcats of the Pac-10 Conference against the North Carolina Tar Heels of the ACC Conference.

Scoring summary

First quarter
 No scoring

Second quarter
 UA – Coston 31-yard FG
 UA – Adams 1-yard run (Coston kick)
UA – Coston 38-yard FG

Third quarter
UA – Valder 52-yard FG
UA – Horton 13-yard pass from Jenkins (Coston kick)
UA – Greathouse 5-yard run (Coston kick)
NC – Dorn 58-yard run (Gliarmis kick)

Fourth quarter
NC – Marriott 6-yard pass from Maye (Gliarmis kick)
NC – Maye 2-yard run (Gliarmis kick)

This was Arizona's first ever bowl win, after four previous losses and one tie in their previous five bowl appearances.

Statistics

References

Aloha Bowl
Aloha Bowl
Arizona Wildcats football bowl games
North Carolina Tar Heels football bowl games
December 1986 sports events in the United States
Aloha